The Swedish Board of Agriculture (commonly known as Jordbruksverket) is a  Government agency in Sweden that answers to the Ministry of Agriculture. The agency headquarters is located in Jönköping.

It is responsible for agriculture, horticulture and reindeer husbandry, and functions as the Swedish government's expert authority in the field of agricultural and food policy.

See also 
Government agencies in Sweden

External links 
Swedish Board of Agriculture

Board of Agriculture
Government agencies established in 1991
Agricultural organizations based in Sweden
Jönköping County
1991 establishments in Sweden